Ashley Peldon (born April 2, 1984) is an American actress, starting as a child actress, transitioning to adult roles, then primarily voice acting after 2008. She has many credits for screams provided for sound effects.

Life and career
Peldon and her sister Courtney began their careers as child actors. In 1988, Ashley Peldon was cast as Marah Lewis, daughter of Joshua and Reva Lewis on the daytime soap opera Guiding Light. Peldon received a Daytime Emmy Award nomination for her third year on the show.

She went on to appear in motion pictures such as The Lemon Sisters, Stella, Deceived, Drop Dead Fred, Arthur Miller's The Crucible, Ghost World and other films. For two years Peldon appeared on the NBC television series The Mommies, ABC television series Home Improvement and has had recurring roles on such television series as That 70s Show and The Pretender. Peldon starred as "spoiled actress Amy King" in MTV's comedy series Connected.

In January 2007, Peldon graduated from Skidmore College in New York with a bachelor's degree in Child Psychology and Film. Her interest in child psychology originated from her dramatic role as a sexually abused child in CBS' Child of Rage when she was 7 years old. In February 2008, Peldon directed an Allan Heinberg play for TV Takes the Stage. The play starred Bonnie Somerville and Melissa Sagemiller.

Peldon earned her master's degree in clinical psychology. In 2014, she was pursuing a PhD in depth psychology.

Personal life
Peldon married her husband Steve Hurdle in 2010 and they have two daughters.

Awards and nominations
She was nominated in 1991 for a Daytime Emmy at the Daytime Emmy Awards for Outstanding Younger Actress in a Drama Series for The Guiding Light (1952).

She is a multiple and a six and three years consecutive nominee and award winner of a Young Artist Award at the Young Artist Awards:
 1990 - Won for Best Young Actress in a Daytime Drama for The Guiding Light (1952)
 1991 - Nominated for Best Young Actress in a Daytime Series for The Guiding Light (1952).
 1992 - Nominated for Best Young Actress in a Daytime Series for The Guiding Light (1952).
 1993 - Won for Best Young Actress Under Ten in a Television Movie for Child of Rage (1992) (TV).
 1994 - Nominated for Outstanding Youth Ensemble in a Television Series for The Mommies (1993) shared with Sam Gifaldi, Ryan Merriman, Shiloh Strong and Joey Zimmerman and won for Best Actress Under Ten in a Television Series or Show for Shameful Secrets (1993) (TV) tied with Ashley Johnson for Phenom (1993).
 1995 - Nominated three times, for Best Youth Comedienne in a TV Show and for Best Performance by an Actress Under Ten in a TV Series for The Mommies (1993) and for Best Performance by a Youth Actress in a TV Mini-Series or Special for Without Warning (1994) (TV).
 1997 - Nominated for Best Performance in a Drama Series by a Young Actress for The Pretender (1996).
 1998 - Nominated twice, for Best Performance in a Voiceover in TV or Film by a Young Actress for Cats Don't Dance (1997) and for Best Performance in a TV Movie/Pilot/Mini-Series by a Leading Young Actress for The Westing Game (1997) (TV) as the main character Tabitha Ruth/Turtle/Alice Wexler.
 1999 - Nominated for Best Performance in a TV Drama Series by a Guest Starring Young Actress for The Pretender (1996).

Filmography

References

External links
 
 
 
 
 MSN-Movie: Ashley Peldon
 Peldon's Perfume Company
 Publicityville - Directed by Ashley Peldon

1984 births
Actresses from New York City
American child actresses
American film actresses
Place of birth missing (living people)
American soap opera actresses
American television actresses
American voice actresses
20th-century American actresses
21st-century American actresses
Living people
Skidmore College alumni